Al Ritz (born Albert "Al" Joachim; August 27, 1901 – December 22, 1965), was an American comedian, actor and entertainer. Ritz was the oldest of the Ritz Brothers.

Early life

Ritz was born Albert Joachim on August 27, 1901, in Newark, New Jersey. His father, Max Joachim (December 1871–January 4, 1939) owned a haberdashery while his mother, Pauline Joachim (May 1874–November 26, 1935) was a housewife. Ritz's father was a native of Austria-Hungary and his mother was born in Russia. Ritz  had three brothers, George, Samuel (later "Jimmy Ritz"), and Harry, and a sister, Gertrude Soll.

Career

Early career

Ritz began his solo career shortly after he finished high school to join vaudeville.

The Ritz Brothers

After the three Joachim brothers graduated from high school, they decided to team up as a song-and-comedy act. The brothers began using the name "Ritz" for their nightclub act reportedly after seeing the name on the side of a laundry truck. With fourth brother George acting as their agent, the Ritz Brothers worked nightclubs and vaudeville. The act consisted of the trio indulging in precision dancing, tongue-twisting lampoons of popular stories and songs, and slapstick.

In 1934, the Ritz boys made their screen debut in the two-reel comedy Hotel Anchovy, which led to their being signed by 20th Century Fox as a specialty act. Sing, Baby, Sing (1936) was the first feature film to costar the Ritzes, and their first starring role followed a year later in Life Begins in College.

Throughout the 1940s and 1950s, the Ritz Brothers continued a wildly popular supper club and resort circuit and made their first appearances as TV guest stars.

Personal life

Ritz was married once, to Antoinette 'Annette' Calamari Ritz. They were married until his death. Ritz did not have any children.

Death

The Ritz Brothers were appearing at New Orleans' Roosevelt Hotel in December 1965 when Al died of a heart attack on December 22. He was buried at the Hollywood Forever Cemetery in Los Angeles.  His wife, Antoinette 'Annette' Calamari Joachim was interred beside him upon her death on January 30, 1992.

Filmography

References

External links

1901 births
1965 deaths
American male comedians
Comedians from New Jersey
American male film actors
Jewish American comedians
Jewish American male actors
Male actors from Newark, New Jersey
American male comedy actors
20th-century American comedians
20th-century American male actors
Vaudeville performers
Burials at Hollywood Forever Cemetery
Jewish American male comedians
20th-century American Jews